is a passenger railway station in the town of Minakami, Gunma, Japan, operated by the East Japan Railway Company (JR East). It is jokingly known as Japan's Number One Mole Station (日本一のモグラ駅, Nippon ichi no mogura eki) due to the fact that passengers must make a 10 minute descent down a tunnel in order to reach the northbound platform. It is the deepest train station in Japan.

Lines

Station layout
Doai Station is unusual in that it has two single side platforms, one of which is elevated, and the other is located underground within the Shin-Shimizu Tunnel. The station is unattended. It is only reachable by stairs, as there are no elevators or escalators. It takes ten minutes to walk the 486 steps from the ticket gate to the platform. The above-ground platform for the southbound trains (to ) is at ground level.

Platforms

History
The station opened on 19 December 1936. With the privatization of Japanese National Railways (JNR) on 1 April 1987, the station came under the control of JR East.

In popular media
The climb up the steps from the underground platform features at the start of the novel, NHK dramatization and movie versions of Climber's High by Hideo Yokoyama.

Online sources state it is haunted, and as such has become a local ghost hunting spot.

Surrounding area
Mount Tanigawa (one of the "100 famous mountains in Japan")

See also
 List of railway stations in Japan

References

External links

 Station information (JR East) 

Railway stations in Gunma Prefecture
Railway stations in Japan opened in 1936
Stations of East Japan Railway Company
Jōetsu Line
Minakami, Gunma